Balakai Mesa is a summit in the U.S. state of Arizona.

Balakai Mesa is a name derived from the Navajo language meaning "place with reeds on it".

References

Mountains of Arizona
Mountains of Apache County, Arizona
Mountains of Navajo County, Arizona